Lorand or Loránd or Lóránd may refer to:

Given name:
Loránd Eötvös (1848–1919), Hungarian physicist
Lóránd Fülöp (born 1997), Romanian professional footballer
Lorand Gaspar (born 1925), Romanian–born French poet
Loránd Győry (1871–1926), Hungarian politician, Minister of Agriculture for few days in 1919
Loránd Kesztyűs (1915–1979) was a Hungarian physician, immunologist, pathophysiologist
Loránd Lohinszky (1924–2013), Romanian Merited Artist and university professor of Hungarian ethnicity
J. Lorand Matory, Professor of Cultural Anthropology and African and African American Studies at Duke University
Lóránd Szatmári (born 1988), Romanian-born Hungarian football player
Loránd Szilágyi (born 1985), Romanian football player that currently plays for Honvéd in the Hungarian NB I
Lorand Marton (born 1992), Romanian musician and music producer, owner of the musical project IV-IN

Surname:
Colette Lorand (1923–2019), Swiss soprano
Laszlo Lorand (born 1923), Hungarian-American biochemist who studies the clotting of blood and other bodily fluids

Other:
Eötvös Loránd University (founded 1635 in Budapest), one of the oldest and largest universities in Hungary

See also
Loran (disambiguation)
Lournand
Lorándite